Elena Georgieva (born 26 January 1947) is a Bulgarian former gymnast. She competed at the 1972 Summer Olympics.

References

External links
 

1947 births
Living people
Bulgarian female artistic gymnasts
Olympic gymnasts of Bulgaria
Gymnasts at the 1972 Summer Olympics
Sportspeople from Sofia Province